Songs That Made This Country Great is a compilation album by the American new wave artist Stan Ridgway, with songs spanning from his time with Wall of Voodoo to his third album, Partyball. It was released on February 25, 1992, through I.R.S. Records.

Track listing
 "Salesman" – 5:26
Originally from The Big Heat.
 "Lonely Town" – 4:09
Originally from Mosquitos.
 "Drive, She Said" – 4:23
Originally from The Big Heat.
 "Don't Box Me In" – 4:36
Originally from the Rumble Fish Soundtrack.
 "Can't Complain" – 3:49
Originally from Mosquitos.
 "Goin' Southbound" – 4:42
Originally from Mosquitos.
 "Ring of Fire (Single Edit)" – 3:44
Originally from The Index Masters.
 "Camouflage (Single Remix Edit)" – 4:59
Originally from The Big Heat.
 "The Overlords" – 4:59
Originally from Partyball.
 "Lost Weekend" – 5:00
Originally from Call of the West.
 "Cannon Song (aka Army Song)" – 2:17
Originally from The Threepenny Opera, released on Lost in the Stars: The Music of Kurt Weill.
 "The Big Heat" – 4:30
Originally from The Big Heat.
 "Peg and Pete and Me" – 4:41
Originally from Mosquitos.
 "Mexican Radio (Edit)" – 3:56
Originally from Call of the West.
 "I Wanna Be a Boss" – 4:52
Originally from Partyball.
 "Walkin' Home Alone" – 4:33
Originally from The Big Heat.

References

Stan Ridgway albums
1989 greatest hits albums
I.R.S. Records compilation albums
Albums produced by Joe Chiccarelli